Randy Nauert (pronounced "Nort"; January 1, 1945 – February 7, 2019) was an American surf music and culture entrepreneur. He started in the music business as a bass player who played with The Bel-Airs and took his experience to broader appeal with The Challengers who were in the forefront of the surf music explosion in southern California. He also worked as a composer, arranger, music manager, producer and music publisher. He is well known as being one of the first pioneers of surf music.

Overview
Randy Nauert was a surf music pioneer. He enjoyed surfing and playing his bass guitar in bands during his school years. He taught Rick Griffin how to surf. In 1960, the first professional band he played in was named The Bel-Airs and in late 1962 he co-founded The Challengers. They produced a smash hit album titled “Surfbeat” released in January 1963. “Surfbeat” took the California Sound and surf music to new levels of acceptance. It remains the best selling surf album of all time. His band released 15 Challengers albums throughout the sixties as well as 12 others recorded under different names for the US and foreign markets. He appeared on TV shows during the peak of surf music's heyday such as Hollywood A Go-Go, Surf's Up, The Lloyd Thaxton Show, American Bandstand and other local shows in the Los Angeles area. He also worked as a record producer through the rest of the 60's evolving with hot rod rock, folk rock, pop, rock and psychedelic rock music as they developed. Nauert continued in the music and film industry throughout the decades that followed.

Death and legacy
Randy Nauert died on February 7, 2019, of a heart attack. He endured prolonged suffering from his fire recovery efforts in the area that he lived in for over two months prior to his death. Nauert helped many known and unknown artists and was connected in many aspects of the music business. Nauert is known as a caring person who helped others and cared for his family and friends. He was a living history book for the communities he lived in and the music he helped pioneer in the exploding pop culture scene in southern California. He adopted and raised many animals over his lifetime and educated others about their proper treatment.

Credits (incomplete)

Bands and music 
The Bel-Airs
The Surfaris
The Challengers
 The Good Guys
 The Surfriders
 The Clee-Shays
 The De-Fenders

TV and film
 The 6.25 Show 1963 TV
 Celebrity Party 1963 TV
 Thank Your Lucky Stars 1964 TV
 The Lloyd Thaxton Show 1965 TV
 Hollywood A Go Go 1965-1966 TV
 American Bandstand 1965-1966 TV 
 The Shack 2012 Film
 New Dimensions 2018 Film

See also
List of people from Malibu, California

References

External links
 
 

1945 births
2019 deaths
Musicians from California
American bass guitarists
American male composers
American composers
American music managers
Record producers from California